Horogouri Pice Hotel is an Indian Bengali drama television series which premiered on 12 September 2022 on Star Jalsha and also digitally available on Disney+ Hotstar. It stars Rahul Mazumder and Subhosmita Mukherjee as the leads.

Plot 
The plot of the story evolves around a daughter of a rich family and highly-educated girl adjusting in a middle-class family after her marriage.

Cast

Main 
 Subhosmita Mukherjee as Oishani Ghosh (née Chatterjee) - Shankar's wife, Sohini's sister.
 Rahul Mazumder as Shankar Ghosh - Oishani's husband, Maheshwari and Kaushik's son.

Recurring

Ghosh family 
 Mithu Chakrabarty as Maheshwari Ghosh - Shankar's mother, Oishani's mother in-law. 
 Anindya Sarkar as Satyakinkar Ghosh - Shankar's father, Oishani's father in-law. 
 Surabhi Mallick as Mitali Ghosh - Shankar's elder sister in-law, Piku's Mother.
 Jishnu Bhattacharya as Piku Ghosh - Mitali's son.
 Soumyadip Singha Roy as Dibakar - Shankar's maternal cousin brother, Shiuli's husband.
 Taniya Roy as Shiuli - Dibakar's wife.
 Arunava Dey as Bhaskar Ghosh  - Shankar's younger brother. 
 Soumi Banerjee as Bani Ghosh - Shankar's younger sister. 
 Shreya Chatterjee as Mohini - Ghosh family's maid.
 Rahul Banerjee as Prabhakar Ghosh - Shankar's elder brother , Mitali's estranged husband.

Chatterjee Family 
 Tania Kar as Sohini Roy (née Chatterjee) - Tapas's wife, Oishani and Debu's sister.
 Manoj Ojha as Tapas Roy - Sohini's husband, Oishani's elder brother in-law and rival.
 Poonam Basak as Debjani Chatterjee aka Debu - Sohini and Oishani's youngest sister.

Others 
 Jayanta Das as Bilu - Shankar's friend. 
 Soma Banerjee as Mitali's mother, Tapas's cosin sister.
 Olivia Malakar as Sharmistha - Oishani's friend, Shankar's former fiance.
 Gautam Mukherjee as Mahesh Agarwal - A builder, Tapas's partner.
 Roosha Chatterjee as Ushoshi Ghosh - a IPS officer, Extended Cameo Appearance from Tomay Amay Mile.

References

External links 
 Horogouri Pice Hotel on Disney+ Hotstar

Indian drama television series
Star Jalsha original programming
2022 Indian television series debuts
Bengali-language television programming in India